Alliance Party (Partido Alianza) is a centre-right political party in Panama.

The party was founded on March 2, 2018, by federal deputy José Muñoz (formerly of the Democratic Change party). As of April 2019 the party listed more than 39,000 members.

Initially, the party sought to have its own electoral offer and held its presidential primaries on October 7, 2018, having as winner José Domingo Arias, former presidential candidate of the CD during 2014; However, the low participation in the primaries and the subsequent resignation of Arias as a presidential candidate on December 26, 2018, led to the rapprochement of the party with the CD, and an alliance was formed between the two parties a few days later, to participate in the 2019 general election and having Rómulo Roux of the CD as the presidential candidate of the "A change to wake up" alliance.

Platform

The party is considered a liberal nationalist one, supporting gender equality and defending the secular state.

External links
Party website
Electoral Court information page

References 

Political parties established in 2018
Political parties in Panama